Flintville may refer to:
Flintville, Tennessee
Flintville, Wisconsin